The name Vamco has been used for four tropical cyclones in the Western Pacific Ocean. The name was contributed by Vietnam, and is a river in southern Vietnam.

 Tropical Storm Vamco (2003) (T0311, 12W, Manang) – struck China.
 Typhoon Vamco (2009) (T0910, 11W) – Category 4-equivalent typhoon, churned in the open ocean.
 Tropical Storm Vamco (2015) (T1519, 19W) - struck Vietnam.
 Typhoon Vamco (2020) (T2022, 25W, Ulysses) - powerful Category 4-equivalent typhoon, made landfall on Luzon and in Vietnam.  

The name Vamco was retired following the 2020 typhoon season, it was replaced with Bang-lang, and which refers to the purple bloom as a lovely indicator of the beginning of summer (Lagerstroemia speciosa).

Pacific typhoon set index articles